Einer Viveros Torres  (born 31 December 1970) is a former Colombian football player.

Club career
Viveros began and spent most of his career with Unión Magdalena. He also played for Deportes Tolima and Deportivo Pasto, where he participated in the Copa Libertadores.

See also
Football in Colombia
List of football clubs in Colombia

References

External links
Profile at GolGolGol

1970 births
Living people
Colombian footballers
Unión Magdalena footballers
Deportes Tolima footballers
Independiente Santa Fe footballers
Deportivo Pasto footballers
Atlético Huila footballers
Deportes Quindío footballers
Association football defenders
People from Cesar Department